Nowogródek Voivodeship was a voivodeship of the Grand Duchy of Lithuania from 1507 to 1795, with the capital in the town of Nowogródek (now Novogrudok, Belarus). Since 1569 it was located in the Polish–Lithuanian Commonwealth, as part of Lithuania.

History
The Voivodeship was composed of three counties, Novogrudok, Vawkavysk, Slonim, as well as the Duchy of Slutsk. It had two senators, two deputies for the Sejm, and two deputies for the Lithuanian Tribunal. Its capital was the town of Nyazvizh with the Radziwiłł family's castle and treasury. Novogrudok Voivodeship ceased to exist along with the Polish-Lithuanian state when it was partitioned out of existence.

Zygmunt Gloger in his monumental book Historical Geography of the Lands of Old Poland provides this description of the Nowogródek Voivodeship:“Slavic lands along the upper Neman, after collapse of the Kievan Rus’ were in 1241 ransacked by the forces of the Mongol Empire, under Batu Khan. After the Mongol raid, it turned into a desert, and was annexed by the Grand Duchy of Lithuania. In c. 1500, local Lithuanian dukes were named voivodes, thus Nowogródek Voivodeship was created. Like the neighbouring Brest Litovsk Voivodeship, Nowogródek Voivodeship was rather narrow but very long, stretching from the upper Narew and Białowieża Forest, to the spot where the Ptsich flows into the Pripyat (...)Nowogródek Voivodeship was divided into three counties: those of Nowogródek, Wolkowysk, and Slonim. Furthermore, it included the Duchy of Sluck and Kapyl. Each county had its own sejmik, with each electing two deputies to the Sejm, and two to the Lithuanian Tribunal. It had only two senators, who were the Voivode and the Castellan of Nowogródek (...) Northern part of the voivodeship, mainly the County of Nowogródek and the Duchy of Sluck were among most fertile lands in Lithuania, with hilly landscape and several beautiful towns, such as Tuhanowicze, Switez and Woroncza".

Gallery

Voivodes
 Martynas Goštautas (Marcin Gasztołdowicz; 1464–1471), appointed by King Casimir Jagiellon
 Albertas Goštautas (1508–1514), to King Sigismund I the Old
 Jan Zabrzeziński (1514–1530)
 Stanislovas Goštautas (Stanisław Gasztołd, 1530–1542), to King Sigismund II Augustus
 Grzegorz Ostik (1542–1544)
 Aleksander Chodkiewicz (1544–1549)
 Alexander Polubinsky (1549–1551)
 Ivan Ermine (1551–1558)
 Paweł Sapieha (1558–1579)
 Mikołaj VII Radziwiłł (1579–1590)
 Teodor Skumin Tyszkiewicz (1590–1618)
 Mikołaj Sapieha (1618–1638), to King Sigismund III Vasa
 Aleksander Słuszka (1638–1643)
 Tomasz Sapieha (I 1643–IV 1646)
 Jury Hreptovich (1646–1650)
 Nicholas Kshiftof Khaletskaya (1650–1653)
 Peter Kazimierz Vezhevich (1653–1658)
 Krzysztof Wołodkowicz (1658–1670)
 Jan Kersnovskaya (1670)
 Dmitrij Polubinsky (1670–1689)
 Alexander Bohuslav Unehovsky (1689)
 Stefan Tyzenhauz (1689–1709)
 Jan Mikołaj Radziwiłł (1709–1729)
 Mikołaj Faustin Radziwiłł (1729–1746)
 Jerzy Radziwiłł (1746–1754)
 Józef Aleksander Jabłonowski (1754–1773)
 Józef Niesiołowski (1773–1795)

See also
 Nowogródek Voivodeship (1919–1939)

References

 
Former voivodeships of Grand Duchy of Lithuania
Nowogrodzkie
1507 establishments in Europe
1507 establishments in Lithuania
1795 disestablishments in the Polish–Lithuanian Commonwealth
Early Modern history of Belarus